Pandasozhanallur is a panchayat village in Nettapakkam Commune in the Union Territory of Puducherry, India. It is also a revenue village under Nettapakkam firka. Pandasozhanallur is also known as PS Nallur.

Geography
Pandasozhanallur is bordered by Nettapakkam in the west, Kalmandapam in the north,  Mitta Mandagapattu village(Tamil Nadu) in the east and Malattar in the south

History
According to inscriptions in the Malligajuneswarar temple here, the village must have been as Thirumudavanpalli during the days of Kulothunga - I (11th century), named after Thirumudavan, probably a chieftain in whose honour the Palli was built. The name of this Palli may have been ascribed to the village in due course. Since 12th Century the village is said to have been called Pandithasolanllur, after Rajaraja II who was otherwise known as Rajapandithan, erudite as he was both in Tamil and Sanskrit. The name Pandithasolanallur in due course changed into Pandasozhanur. Now it is called Pandasozhanallur.

This village is historical place

Transport
Pandasozhanallur is located at 2 km. from Nettapakkam on Frontier State Highway (RC-21). Pandasozhanallur can be reached directly by any bus running between Pondicherry and Karaiyamputhur running via Nettapakkam. Alternatively One can reach Nettapakkam by Pondicherry to Maducarai Bus and then took other means to reach Pandasozhanallur.

Road Network
Pandasozhanallur is connected to Pondicherry by Frontier State Highway (RC-21). Pandasozhanallur is also connected by Kalmandapam-Pandasozhanallur road.

Tourism

Malligarjunar Temple
Malligarjunar Temple is one of the ancient temple in Puducherry. It belongs to Chozha period.

Gallery

Politics
Pandasozhanallur is a part of Nettapakkam (Union Territory Assembly constituency) which comes under Puducherry (Lok Sabha constituency)

References

External links
 Official website of the Government of the Union Territory of Puducherry

Villages in Puducherry district